Calliostoma madagascarense is a species of sea snail, a marine gastropod mollusk in the family Calliostomatidae.

Some authors place this taxon in the subgenus Calliostoma (Kombologion).

Description

Distribution
This species occurs in the Indian Ocean off Madagascar.

References

 Vilvens, Nolf & Verstraeten, Description of Calliostoma madagascarense n. sp. (Gastropoda, Trochidae, Calliostomatinae) from Madagascar; Novapex v.5 (2004)
 Bouchet, P.; Fontaine, B. (2009). List of new marine species described between 2002-2006. Census of Marine Life.

External links
 

madagascarense
Gastropods described in 2004